The Campeonato Brasileiro Série C 1990, known as the Terceira Divisão, was a football series played from 29 September to 9 December 2020. It was the third level of the Brazilian National League. The competition had 30 clubs, and four of them were originally promoted to Série B.

In 1991, the Brazilian Football Confederation declared that the 1990 Série C was a deficitary tournament, deciding to extinguish it and allowing 64 teams in the 1991 Campeonato Brasileiro Série B.

First phase

Group A

Group B

Group C

Group D

Group E

Group F

Second phase
Matches played on 4 and 11 November.

|}
Bangu and América de Natal qualified due to best record.

Semifinal

|}

Final

Atlético Goianiense declared as the Campeonato Brasileiro Série C champions after a 3–2 penalty win (0–0 aggregate score).

References

Campeonato Brasileiro Série C seasons
1990 in Brazilian football leagues